The American Academy of Sleep Medicine (AASM) is a United States professional society for the medical subspecialty of sleep medicine which includes disorders of circadian rhythms. It was established in 1975.

The organization's functions include the accreditation of sleep medicine facilities in the United States. According to the AASM, the organization issued its first accreditation to a sleep disorders center in 1977 (April 27, Sleep-Wake Disorders Center, Montefiore Medical Center, New York), and by 2019 had accredited more than 2,600 sleep facilities across the U.S, Canada, and U.S. territories.

Vision and mission 

The organization's vision is that sleep is recognized as essential to health. Its stated mission is advancing sleep care and enhancing sleep health to improve lives.

Membership 
Membership is open to U.S. and international physicians, researchers, advanced practice providers, dentists, psychologists, respiratory therapists, sleep technologists and other health care professionals who are involved in the study, diagnosis and treatment of disorders of sleep and daytime alertness.

Publications 
The AASM publishes the International Classification of Sleep Disorders, which serves as a guide to clinicians in the identification of specific sleep disorders. The current, third edition (ICSD-3) was published in 2014. The AASM also publishes the AASM Manual for the Scoring of Sleep and Associated Events: Rules, Terminology and Technical Specifications, the definitive reference for the evaluation of polysomnography (PSG) and a home sleep apnea test (HSAT). This resource provides rules for scoring sleep stages, arousals, respiratory events during sleep, movements during sleep and cardiac events. It also provides standard montages, electrode placements and digitization parameters. The current version 2.5 was released in April 2018.

The latest findings in sleep medicine are published in the Journal of Clinical Sleep Medicine, the official peer-reviewed journal of the AASM. Published monthly, JCSM includes original clinical research, clinical reviews, case studies and opinion pieces from prominent sleep researchers on circadian rhythms and sleep science.

The AASM also publishes clinical practice guidelines, position papers, position statements, and consensus statements and papers to provide recommendations to clinicians for the evaluation, diagnosis, treatment and follow-up of sleep and circadian rhythm sleep-wake disorders. The clinical practice guidelines are developed by a task force of experts who perform a systematic review of all published evidence on the topic. The evidence is then assessed using The Grading of Recommendations Assessment, Development and Evaluation (GRADE) approach.

Patient and public information about sleep and sleep disorders is available from the AASM on the Sleep Education website.

Annual meeting 
The SLEEP annual meeting of the Associated Professional Sleep Societies LLC (APSS) is a joint venture of the AASM and the Sleep Research Society. The SLEEP meeting provides evidence-based education to advance the science and clinical practice of sleep medicine, disseminates cutting-edge sleep and circadian research, promotes the translation of basic science into clinical practice, and fosters the future of the field by providing career development opportunities at all levels. The meeting attracts about 5,000 attendees each year. Research abstracts from each SLEEP meeting are published annually in a supplement of Sleep, the peer-reviewed publication of the SRS. SLEEP 2022, the 36th annual meeting of the APSS, will be held June 4-8 in Charlotte, North Carolina.

Foundation 
Founded in 1998, the American Academy of Sleep Medicine Foundation is a not-for-profit 501(c)(3) charitable and scientific organization that was established by the AASM. Formerly the American Sleep Medicine Foundation (ASMF), the AASM Foundation has invested in the future of sleep medicine by supporting more than 200 awards totaling over $13.5 million in funding. Its portfolio includes Strategic Research Awards and Career Development Awards.

References

External links 
 

Sleep medicine organizations
Medical associations based in the United States
Medical and health professional associations in Chicago